Frederick Gilmore "Teddy" Oke (September 20, 1885 – April 30, 1937) was a Canadian professional ice hockey player, referee and team owner. Oke played for the Toronto Tecumsehs and Toronto Blueshirts of the National Hockey Association (NHA) and the Halifax Crescents of the Maritime Professional Hockey League (MPHL). He was the owner of the minor-league Kitchener Flying Dutchmen of the Canadian Professional Hockey League.

Hockey career
Born in Uxbridge, Ontario, Oke played junior ice hockey with the Uxbridge Ontario Hockey Association (OHA) team from 1902 until 1904. He played one further season of junior with the Sault Ste. Marie Tagonas  of the Northern Ontario League. Oke became a professional with the Haileybury Hockey Club in the Timiskaming Professional Hockey League in 1906. He played in three seasons with Haileybury. In 1912, Oke signed with the new Toronto Tecumsehs, playing one season with the club. In 1913–14, he played with Halifax, and in 1914–15, he played with the Toronto Blueshirts.

In 1926, Oke was one of the founders of the Canadian Professional Hockey League (CPHL), in which he owned the Kitchener Millionaires. Oke purchased the Toronto team in the Can-Pro league in 1928 and moved the Millionaires players to Toronto for one year, splitting the players with a new team in Kitchener, the Kitchener Flying Dutchmen. In 1929, the International Hockey League was formed and the team was renamed the Toronto Falcons. It played one season before disbanding. Oke would do double duty that season, replacing the coach, Hughie Lehman. That season the CPHL was continued as a supplier league to the IHL, and Kitchener continued for one season in that league.

The F. G. "Teddy" Oke Trophy of the American Hockey League (AHL) is named after Oke, who presented it in 1927 to the CPHL champion London Panthers.

References

1885 births
1937 deaths
People from Uxbridge, Ontario
Toronto Blueshirts players
Toronto Tecumsehs players
Ice hockey people from Ontario
Canadian ice hockey left wingers